José Gregorio Camacho Lascarro (born April 26, 1983 in Barinas) is a Venezuelan judoka, who played for the middleweight category. He is a two-time Olympian, a three-time medalist at the Pan American Judo Championships, and a bronze medalist for his division at the 2007 Pan American Games in Rio de Janeiro, Brazil.

Camacho made his official debut for the 2004 Summer Olympics in Athens, where he lost the first preliminary match of men's middleweight class (90 kg), with an ippon and a kuchiki-taoshi (single leg takedown), to Argentina's Eduardo Costa.

At the 2008 Summer Olympics in Beijing, Camacho competed for the second time in men's 90 kg class. Unlike his previous Olympics, Camacho defeated Ukraine's Valentyn Grekov in the first preliminary round, before losing out his next match, with an ippon and a tomoe nage (circle throw) to Pan American judo champion Eduardo Santos of Brazil.

References

External links

NBC Olympics Profile

1983 births
Living people
Venezuelan male judoka
Olympic judoka of Venezuela
Judoka at the 2004 Summer Olympics
Judoka at the 2008 Summer Olympics
People from Barinas (state)
Pan American Games bronze medalists for Venezuela
Pan American Games medalists in judo
South American Games bronze medalists for Venezuela
South American Games silver medalists for Venezuela
South American Games medalists in judo
Judoka at the 2007 Pan American Games
Competitors at the 2006 South American Games
Medalists at the 2007 Pan American Games
20th-century Venezuelan people
21st-century Venezuelan people